Peter Wall may refer to:

Peter Wall (property developer), property developer in Vancouver, Canada
Peter Wall Institute for Advanced Studies, the senior research institute at the University of British Columbia
Peter Wall (footballer), English retired professional footballer 
Peter Wall (British Army officer) (born 1955)
Peter Wall (journalist) (born 1975), Canadian video journalist
Peter Wall (priest) (ordained 1989), Dean of the Diocese of Niagara